Gazipur-4 is a constituency represented in the Jatiya Sangsad (National Parliament) of Bangladesh since 2012 by Simeen Hussain Rimi of the Awami League.

Boundaries 
The constituency encompasses Kapasia Upazila.

History 
The constituency was created in 1984 from a Dhaka constituency when the former Dhaka District was split into six districts: Manikganj, Munshiganj, Dhaka, Gazipur, Narsingdi, and Narayanganj.

Ahead of the 2008 general election, the Election Commission redrew constituency boundaries to reflect population changes revealed by the 2001 Bangladesh census. The 2008 redistricting added a fifth seat to Gazipur District and altered the boundaries of Gazipur-4.

Members of Parliament

Elections

Elections in the 2010s 

Tanjim Ahmad Sohel Taj submitted a letter of resignation from parliament on 23 April 2012. On procedural grounds it was not accepted, but when he again tendered his resignation on 7 July 2012, the seat was declared vacant. Simeen Hussain Rimi, his sister, was elected in a September 2012 by-election.

Elections in the 2000s

Elections in the 1990s

References

External links
 

Parliamentary constituencies in Bangladesh
Gazipur District